Hambantota Troopers cricket team is one of the five provincial cricket teams which make up the Sri Lankan domestic cricket structure representing mainly Hambantota District of Southern Province, Sri Lanka, and with some nearby provinces. In previous occasions, the province was included in to Southern Express and Ruhuna Reds, where part of them was combined in this season as Hambantota Troopers. The cricket team's first participation came during the Twenty20 competition known as the Inter-Provincial Twenty20 2016 season which was known as Super T20 Provincial Tournament.

The team plays their matches in Colombo R. Premadasa Stadium, despite its home ground is MRIC Stadium. Tillakaratne Dilshan is the captain of the side. Besides, the captain Dilshan, Dimuth Karunaratne, Jehan Mubarak, Thilan Thushara and Dilruwan Perera are some of the other notable current Test cricketers and Limited overs cricketers in the national side.

Current squad
The squad for the 2015–16 season as of 26 January 2016.

||  || Tillakaratne Dilshan (c) ||  39 ||  All-rounder ||  RHB ||  ROS
|-
||  || Binura Fernando ||  20 ||  Bowler ||  RHB ||  LMF
|-
||  || Lahiru Gamage ||  27 ||  Batsman ||  LHB ||  RMF 
|-
||  || Angelo Jayasinghe ||  22 ||  Bowler ||  RHB ||  LB
|-
||  || Dimuth Karunaratne ||  27 ||  Batsman ||  LHB ||  RMF
|-
||  || Jehan Mubarak ||  35 ||  Bowler ||  LHB ||  ROB
|-
||  || Sachith Pathirana ||  26 ||  All-rounder ||  LHB ||  LO
|-
||  || Dilruwan Perera ||  33 ||  All-rounder ||  RHB ||  OB
|-
||  || Seekkuge Prasanna ||  30 ||  All-rounder ||  RHB ||  RLB
|-
||  || Ashan Priyanjan ||  26 ||  All-rounder ||  RHB ||  OB
|-
||  || Malinda Pushpakumara ||  28 ||  Batsman ||  RHB ||  LO
|-
||  || Denuwan Rajakaruna ||  25 ||  Wicket-keeper ||  RHB ||  
|-
||  || Lakshitha Rodrigo ||  18 ||  Wicket-keeper ||  RHB ||  
|-
||  || Lakshan Sandakan ||  24 ||  Al-rounder ||  RHB ||  LUO
|-
||  || Alankara Asanka Silva ||  30 ||  All-rounder ||  RHB ||  OB
|-
||  || Andy Solomons ||  28 ||  Bowler ||  RHB ||  RMF 
|-
||  || Thilan Thushara ||  34 ||  All-rounder ||  LHB ||  LMF
|-
||  || Sandun Weerakkody ||  22 ||  Wicket-keeper ||  LHB || 
|}
|}

References

Provincial Twenty20 teams
Sport in Hambantota
Cricket clubs established in 2016
Sports clubs in Sri Lanka
Cricket in Hambantota